Canada Dock railway station was the passenger terminus of the Canada Dock Branch, situated near Canada Dock, Liverpool, England.

History
The station opened on 1 July 1870 as Bootle, being renamed Canada Dock on 5 September 1881.

The station closed to passengers on 5 May 1941 as a result of damage in the Liverpool Blitz, the goods operation continued until 1982, when the branch was closed from Atlantic junction.

Despite closure in 1941 and track lifting in 1981 the station was virtually intact in 1985. It has since been demolished and the land redeveloped.

References

Sources

External links
 The station's history Disused Stations
 The station on a 25" Edwardian OS Map National Library of Scotland
 The station and local lines on multiple maps Rail Maps Online
 The station on line SCT1, with mileages Railway Codes

Former London and North Western Railway stations
Railway stations in Great Britain opened in 1870
Railway stations in Great Britain closed in 1941
Disused railway stations in Liverpool